Sindooracheppu is a 1971 Indian Malayalam-language film, directed by Madhu and produced and written by Yusufali Kechery. The film stars Madhu, Jayabharathi, Prema and Sankaradi. It won the Kerala State Film Award for Second Best Film.

Plot

Cast 

Madhu as Keshavan
Jayabharathi as Ammalu
Prema as Devu
Sankaradi as Sankaran Nair
Shobha as young Ammalu
T. S. Muthaiah as Appunni Kaimal
Paravoor Bharathan as Kittu Kurup
Philomina as Pithachu
Premji as Thirumeni
Bahadoor as Mammad
Radhamani as Neeli
Thodupuzha Radhakrishnan
 B.K Pottakadu
 Sudevan
 B. Krishna
 J.A.R Anand
 Baby Vijaya
 Master Vijaya Kumar

Soundtrack

References

External links 
 

1970s Malayalam-language films
1971 films